Kimberworth Comprehensive School was a comprehensive school in Rotherham, operating from 1914 to 2004. It merged with Old Hall Comprehensive School to form Winterhill School.

History
The institution opened in September 1914 as a school for 11–14 year olds. The buildings were designed by the Rotherham architect James Knight. It later became a comprehensive school, with the upper age extended to 16.

The school closed at the end of the 2003–2004 academic year. The students and many staff transferred to the neighbouring Old Hall Comprehensive School, which was renamed Winterhill School as a result of the amalgamation. Both Winterhill and the nearby Wingfield Business and Enterprise College were rebuilt with extra capacity to accommodate the former Kimberworth students.
Since its closure, the building was used as a temporary base for the "Old Hall City Learning Centre". After their departure, the building became derelict and remained empty for a number of years. In 2011, the building was renovated and was opened as an NHS centre "Kimberworth Place Psalters Centre".

Ofsted inspections
Between the commencement of Ofsted inspections in September 1993 and the school's closure in August 2004, it underwent two full inspections:

Notable alumni
 David Seaman, England footballer

References

Defunct schools in Rotherham
Educational institutions disestablished in 2004
2004 disestablishments in England